Teenagers is a 1961 Egyptian drama film directed by Ahmed Diaeddin. The film was selected as the Egyptian entry for Best Foreign Language Film at the 33rd Academy Awards, but was not accepted as a final nominee.

Plot
The film deals with suppressed Egyptian teenagers who come from different backgrounds. The film focuses on the lives of three teenagers who go to the same high school. Nada (Magda) comes from a high class, wealthy family. She lives in a mansion with her mother, brother and grandfather. The brother became the head of the family after the death of her father. He is a womanizer who spends money on his women, alcohol and drugs. Nada is 16 years old, very beautiful and innocent. She has never experienced true love before. She is not allowed to go out by herself. Her only freedom is when she meets her friends at school and they talk with each other. Nada’s best friend is Amina. Amina, who is the complete opposite of Nada in ever way, comes from a very poor family; she is 16 years old and lives with her mother, stepfather and stepbrother. Her stepfather is a very mean old man and is frequently drunk; he gives them a daily lecture that he is wasting money on his children, especially his son Ahmed who is in college. Ahmed found peace at home because of his stepmother and stepsister who he loved very much. The third teenager, Huda, comes from a well-off family and likes to party every night and skip school to meet boys with the knowledge of her mother and father who believe that they are giving her freedom in life.

Huda invites Nada to her birthday party, but Nada cannot mention it to her mother because she is not allowed to go out anywhere other than school; she eventually concocts a lie for her mother, telling her mother that her best friend is sick and in the hospital and that she wants to go with their maid to visit her.  At the party she meets a man named Issam (Rushdy Abaza), a very handsome military pilot. They fall for each other and slow dance for an hour. Nada comes back home and tells her grandfather. Issam wants to marry Nada but her brother refuses because the family wants her to marry her cousin. Nada’s best friend Amina dies while pregnant with her stepbrother's son after her stepfather forces her to take pills to abort the baby.

After Nada discovers her best friend’s death, she has a nervous break down, made worse because Issam leaves the country on a mission after Nada’s brother refuses him. She becomes sick and even tries to commit suicide. Later her brother feels hurt and goes to locate Issam and bring him to marry her.

Cast
 Magda as Nada
 Rushdy Abaza as Issam

Awards and nominations
The film was nominated for a Golden Bear at the 11th Berlin International Film Festival.

See also
 List of Egyptian films of 1961
 List of Egyptian films of the 1960s
 List of submissions to the 33rd Academy Awards for Best Foreign Language Film
 List of Egyptian submissions for the Academy Award for Best Foreign Language Film

References

External links
 

1961 films
1960s Arabic-language films
1961 drama films
Egyptian black-and-white films
Egyptian drama films
Films directed by Ahmed Diaa Eddine